Gösta Berling's Saga is the debut novel of Swedish author Selma Lagerlöf, published in 1891. It was made into a 1924 silent film directed by Mauritz Stiller starring Greta Garbo, Lars Hanson and Gerda Lundequist. A 1925 opera  I cavalieri di Ekebù by Riccardo Zandonai was also based on it.

Background
In the summer of 1890, a Swedish magazine, the Idun, had offered a prize for the best novel of a certain length. Lagerlöf entered the contest with a few chapters from Gösta Berling, a story which was then beginning to take shape in her mind, and won the prize. In Gösta Berling, Lagerlöf is a romanticist and represents a reaction against the realism which prevailed at the time. As a child, she had absorbed the folk tales of her surroundings, and later on in life it occurred to her like a lightning flash that it was her particular mission to give these stories expression. Gösta Berling's Saga has been called the “prose epic of Swedish country life.”

The scene is laid on the shores of Lake Fryken (Lake Löven in the story) in Värmland. Using wolves, snow, supernatural elements and eccentric upper-class characters to project an exotic image of 1820s Värmland, the novel can be compared to magic realism. The title is meant to give associations to the Icelandic sagas. The first sentence, "Finally, the vicar was in the pulpit," is one of the most famous in Swedish literature.

Plot
The hero, Gösta Berling, is a defrocked Lutheran priest who has been saved by the Mistress of Ekeby from freezing to death and thereupon becomes one of her pensioners in the manor at Ekeby. As the pensioners finally get power in their own hands, they manage the property as they themselves see fit and their lives are filled with many wild adventures. Gösta Berling is their leading spirit, the poet, the charming personality among a band of revelers. Before the story ends, Gösta Berling is redeemed, and even the old Mistress of Ekeby is permitted to come to her old home to die.

English translations
It was first translated by Lillie Tudeer in 1894 as Gösta Berling's Saga, but was unavailable in the US and soon out of print in the UK. This edition was re-printed in 1918 by the American-Scandinavian Foundation with edits and 8 additional chapters that had been quietly omitted from the 1894 edition. It was also translated in 1898 by Pauline Bancroft Flach as The Story of Gösta Berling. Both of these editions are in the public domain and have been commonly reprinted by various publishers over the years.

A new English translation by poet Robert Bly was published (with a translator's afterword) in 1962.  It was put out by Signet Classics under the title The Story of Gosta Berling.  The most recent English translation, by Paul Norlen, was published in 2009 by Penguin.

Main characters
Gösta Berling, defrocked minister and chief character
Margarita Samzelius (née Celsing), the Major's wife — in charge of Ekeby; she gives the cavaliers a place to stay
Sintram, the Evil one who only causes mischief
Marienne Sinclaire (Swedish Marianne Sinclaire), thrown out of her parents' house for kissing Gösta 
Countess Elizabeth (Karlsdotter), from Italy, married to Count Henrik Dohna
Anna Stjärnhök, engaged to a minor character, at one time loves Gösta 
Countess Marta, mother of Henrik, step-mother of Ebba, rich and haughty
Count Henrik Dohna, Elizabeth's husband, known for being 'stupid'
Ebba Dohna, Marta's step-daughter, extremely religious — Gösta's first love
The 12 Cavaliers: Gösta Berling, Colonel Beerencreutz, major Anders Fuchs, Little Ruster, Rutger von Orneclou, Kristian Bergh, Squire Julius, Kevenhuller, Cousin Kristoffer, Uncle Eberhard, Lovenborg, Lilliecrona

Adaptations

Film
 In 1924 it was made into a Swedish silent film (Gösta Berlings saga) starring the then mostly unknown Greta Garbo as Elizabeth and popular film actors Lars Hanson and Gerda Lundequist, directed by Mauritz Stiller.
Television
 Beginning on 10 March 1986, it was released as a 6-part, 347-minute mini-series for Swedish television.
Opera
 The opera by Riccardo Zandonai, I cavalieri di Ekebù (1925) is based on it.
Music
In 2004 a progressive rock group from Sweden was formed under the name Gösta Berlings Saga. They have so far released six studio albums.

References

External links
 
 
Gösta Berling's Saga at Internet Archive, Project Gutenberg and Google Books 
Gösta Berlings saga in Swedish, at Project Runeberg
 

Fiction set in the 1820s
1891 Swedish novels
Novels set in Sweden
Novels by Selma Lagerlöf
Swedish-language novels
Novels set in Värmland
Swedish novels adapted into films
1891 debut novels